Brian Ó Curnáin is an Irish Dialectologist.

Ó Curnáin is a native of Dublin whose parents came from the Connemara Gaeltacht. He currently teaches School of Celtic Studies, Dublin Institute for Advanced Studies, and has published both articles and books.

In 2016, he warned the Gaeltachta would cease to exist within ten years due to "Government strategy ... was in crisis and unsustainable ... Irish speakers in Gaeltacht areas was decreasing and young people’s ability in the language was declining, mainly because of their socialisation through English."

In 2018, he discovered a previously unknown Roscommon version of Cúirt an Mheán Oíche ('The Midnight Court') by the Co. Clare poet, Brian Merriman, written by Éamann Ó hOrchaidh.

External links
 Staff
 Publication
 News item
 News article
 Language Insurgents
 Irish Times news article
 News article

Year of birth missing (living people)
Living people
21st-century Irish writers
Academics of the Dublin Institute for Advanced Studies
Linguists from the Republic of Ireland